Patricia Elliott (July 21, 1938 – December 20, 2015) was an American theatre, film, soap opera, and television actress.

Early life
Elliott was born July 21, 1938, in Gunnison, Colorado to Clyde and Lavon (née Gibson) Elliott. She claimed direct descent from President Ulysses S. Grant, John Winthrop (first governor of Massachusetts) and Mary Lyon (founder of what became Mount Holyoke College). She graduated from South High School, Denver.

In 1960, Elliott graduated from the University of Colorado and then went on to study at the London Academy of Music and Dramatic Art. She returned to work at the Cleveland Play House, the Guthrie Theater in Minneapolis and Arena Stage in Washington, D.C., among others before moving to New York.

Career

Film
Elliott began her career in 1968 with the science fiction film The Green Slime. She would go on to appear in Birch Interval (1976), the comedy/mystery film Somebody Killed Her Husband (1978), and  Natural Enemies (1979).

Television
Elliott is best known for her portrayal of Renée Divine Buchanan on the ABC soap opera One Life to Live, a role she played on a recurring basis from 1988 to 2011. She assumed the role from its originator, actress Phyllis Newman.

In 1973 Elliott appeared in an adaptation of The Man Without a Country and in 1976 portrayed Minnie Adams in The Adams Chronicles, a thirteen-episode miniseries on PBS. In 1978, she appeared in the Made-for-TV-Movie Tartuffe. She guest starred on such television series as Kojak, the ABC Afterschool Special, St. Elsewhere, and Spenser: For Hire.

Theatre
Elliott won a Tony for her performance as Countess Charlotte Malcolm in the Stephen Sondheim musical A Little Night Music. She played the role of Dorine in the 1977 Tony-nominated Circle in the Square revival of Molière's Tartuffe for which she was nominated for a Drama Desk Award. She reprised her role when the production was restaged for television on PBS in 1978.

Personal life
Elliot married Christopher V H Fay on September 10, 1960 in Clinton, Connecticut. They were divorced. She also was briefly married to Peter Heath.

Death
Elliot died in Manhattan on December 20, 2015, aged 77. Broadway.com reported that she died of leiomyosarcoma, a rare cancer.

Filmography

Film

Television

Theatre

Awards and nominations

References

External links

 
 

1938 births
2015 deaths
Actresses from Denver
American film actresses
American musical theatre actresses
American soap opera actresses
American stage actresses
American television actresses
Drama Desk Award winners
Theatre World Award winners
Tony Award winners
20th-century American actresses
21st-century American actresses
Deaths from cancer in New York (state)
People from Gunnison, Colorado
Singers from Denver
Deaths from leiomyosarcoma